Gheorghe "Gigi" Gondiu (born 5 March 2002) is a Moldovan professional footballer who plays as a forward for CSM Sighetu Marmației, on loan from CFR Cluj.

Club career
He made his league debut on 25 May 2021 in Liga I match against FCSB.

Career statistics

Club

Honours
CFR Cluj
Liga I: 2020–21
Supercupa României: 2020

Minaur Baia Mare
Liga III: 2021–22

References

External links
 
 

2002 births
Living people
Footballers from Chișinău
Moldovan people of Romanian descent
Association football forwards
Moldovan footballers
Romanian footballers
Moldova youth international footballers
Moldovan expatriate footballers
Liga I players
Liga III players
CFR Cluj players
CS Minaur Baia Mare (football) players